Gursel Veli (born 8 August 1982) is a Bulgarian football player of Turkish origin, currently playing for Vereya as a midfielder. Veli is an offensive midfielder. His first club was Maritsa Plovdiv. Between 2004 and 2006 he played for PFC Svetkavitsa and Spartak Plovdiv. Veli signed a 3 year deal with Lokomotiv Plovdiv after being released from Spartak Plovdiv in 2007. He was given the №10 shirt. Veli made his official debut for Lokomotiv in a match against Marek Dupnitsa that was held on 22 April 2007. He played for 23 minutes. The result of the match was a 1:3 loss for Loko.

Height - 1.76 m.
Weight - 77 kg.

External links 
  Lokomotiv Plovdiv profile

1982 births
Living people
Bulgarian footballers
Bulgarian people of Turkish descent
First Professional Football League (Bulgaria) players
PFC Spartak Varna players
PFC Svetkavitsa players
FC Spartak Plovdiv players
PFC Lokomotiv Plovdiv players
PFC Nesebar players

Association football midfielders